USS Artisan (ABSD-1), later redesignated as (AFDB-1), was a ten-section, non-self-propelled, large auxiliary floating drydock of the United States Navy. The only U.S. warship with this name, Artisan was constructed in sections during 1942 and 1943 by the Everett-Pacific Shipbuilding & Dry Dock Company, in Everett, Washington; the Chicago Bridge & Iron Company, in Eureka, California; the Pollock-Stockton Shipbuilding Company, in Stockton, California; and the Chicago Bridge & Iron Company, in Morgan City, Louisiana. This ship was commissioned at Everett, Washington, on 10 May 1943, Captain Andrew R. Mack in command. With all ten sections joined, she was 927 feet long, 28 feet tall (keel to welldeck), and with an inside clear width of 133 feet 7 inches. 

Each section was 3,850 tons and 93 feet long, with a 165-foot beam, a 75-foot molded depth, and 10,000 tons of lifting capacity. Each had four ballast compartments. Under tow, the two side walls were folded down to reduce wind resistance and lower the center of gravity.

ABSD-1 had a traveling crane with an 85-foot radius and 15-ton capacity.

She was generally deployed with two or more support barges.

War service

In 1943, the new drydock was towed to the southwestern Pacific in two convoys. The pair of sections constructed on the Gulf Coast left Morgan City, Louisiana, on 14 July 1943. The eight sections built in Washington and California were towed to San Francisco, California, before putting to sea on 28 August 1943. The first two sections arrived at Espiritu Santo in the New Hebrides on 24 September; the West Coast sections on 2 October. Later that month, the crew began to assemble the ship. Thirteen sailors drowned on 2 November when one of its sections sank.

By the end of 1943, she was a working drydock of eight sections repairing a variety of Navy ships at Naval Advance Base Espiritu Santo. In April 1944, ABSD-1 became a full ten-section drydock when her remaining section was combined with another from ABSD-2 and was joined to the eight already functioning.

She served in the New Hebrides until mid-April 1945, when she received orders to move forward to the big base, Leyte-Samar Naval Base, at Leyte Gulf in the Philippines. ABSD-1 was disassembled for towing by the beginning of June and, on 30 June, the first six sections began the voyage, via Hollandia, New Guinea, to Leyte. The remaining four sections left on 7 July. The first group arrived at Manicani Island in Leyte Gulf, on 27 July, and assembly began three days later. On 2 August, the rest of the drydock entered Manicani Bay and, by mid-September, all ten sections had been rejoined. The floating drydock resumed repair work soon thereafter, and it continued through February 1946. On 28 February 1946, she undocked four-yard craft and began preparations for inactivation. ABSD-1 was decommissioned on 31 May 1946. 

A sister drydock, USS ABSD-5, also repaired ships at Manicani Island from May 1945 to May 1946.

Post-war service

She remained in the Philippines through the summer and fall of 1946. In August 1946, the advanced base sectional dock was reclassified a large auxiliary floating drydock and was redesignated AFDB-1. Sometime after November 1946, her sections were towed from the Philippines to Pearl Harbor where they were placed in reserve. Her inactivity lasted almost exactly five years. She was recommissioned at Pearl Harbor on 2 June 1951, Captain O. J. Stien, USNR, in command. Later that month, she was towed, in sections, to Guam in the Mariana Islands where the Navy was improving another repair facility in fairly close proximity to the combat zone in the year-old Korean War. Reporting for duty on 26 June 1951, she was not completely assembled and ready for duty until the beginning of March 1952.

Active at Apra Harbor not quite three years, AFBD-1 was out of commission again and back in reserve by January 1955. She remained inactive at Guam for a little more than 15 years. In 1970, five of her sections were moved to Subic Bay in the Philippines where the floating drydock was placed in service once again on 17 November 1970. Her third period of active service proved to be her longest lasting almost 16 years. On 7 June 1979, she was named Artisan. In October 1986, Artisan was placed out of service, and her name was struck from the Naval Vessel Register. In March 1987, however, Artisan received a reprieve when her name was reinstated on the Naval Vessel Register.

On 16 August 1996 her Section 1D was reclassified as unclassified miscellaneous vessel IX-521, and on 2 March 1998 her Section 1C was reclassified to IX-525.

IX-521 was struck from the Naval Vessel Register on 26 April 2006, and it was subsequently sold during 2007. IX-525 remained on the register until 22 June 2009 and it was also sold in 2010.

Image gallery

References 

 – sections A, G, H, I, J, and E
 – IX-534 (ex ABSD-1 section B) and IX-525 (ex ABSD-1 section C)
 – IX-521 (ex ABSD-1 section D) and section F

External links
 
 

 

Ships built by Everett-Pacific Shipbuilding & Dry Dock Company
Floating drydocks of the United States Navy
1943 ships